Admiral Hamilton may refer to:

Frederick Hamilton (Royal Navy officer) (1856–1917), British Royal Navy admiral
Sir Charles Hamilton, 2nd Baronet, of Marlborough House (1767–1849), British Royal Navy admiral
Charles Powell Hamilton (1747–1825), British Royal Navy admiral
Charles S. Hamilton (born 1952), U.S. Navy rear admiral
Sir Edward Hamilton, 1st Baronet (1772–1851), British Royal Navy admiral
James Hamilton, 1st Earl of Arran (1767–1849), British Royal Navy admiral
John Graham Hamilton (1910–1994), British Royal Navy admiral
Louis Keppel Hamilton (1890–1957), British Royal Navy admiral
Richard Vesey Hamilton (1829–1912), British Royal Navy admiral
Tom Hamilton (American football) (1905–1994), U.S. Navy rear admiral
William Hamilton, Duke of Hamilton (1634–1694), Lord High Admiral of Scotland

See also
William Baillie-Hamilton (1803–1881), British Royal Navy admiral